The 2nd Bombardment of Algiers took place between 12 and 21 July 1784. A joint Spanish-Neapolitan-Maltese-Portuguese fleet commanded by the Spanish Admiral Antonio Barceló bombarded the city, which was the main base of the Barbary corsairs, with the aim of forcing them to interrupt their activities. The second bombardment followed a similarly failed expedition the preceding year.

Background

In August 1783, in response to acts of piracy undertaken by the city, a Spanish fleet with Maltese participation under Antonio Barceló bombarded Algiers for 8 days. The expedition ended in failure with some casualties, vast expenditure of ammunition and no effect. Significant propaganda was made by the participants to portray the attack as a success, but it only inflicted minor damages and was described by the Spanish court as a "festival of fireworks too costly and long for how little it entertained the Moors". Five Algerian privateers captured two Spanish merchant vessels near Palamós in September 1783 as a gesture of defiance. The city's defenses were reinforced with a new 50-gun fortress, 4,000 Turkish volunteer soldiers were recruited in Anatolia, and European aides were hired to assist in the building fortifications and batteries. In addition, at least 70 vessels were prepared to repel the Spanish, and a reward of one thousand gold pieces was offered by the Dey to anyone who captured a ship of the attacking fleet.

Meanwhile, in Cartagena, Barceló had finished preparations for a new expedition. His fleet consisted of four 80-gun ships of line, four frigates, 12 xebecs, 3 brigs, 9 small vessels, and an attacking force of 24 gunboats armed with pieces of 24 pounds, 8 more with 18 pounds' pieces, 7 lightly armed to board the Algerian vessels, 24 armed with mortars, and 8 bomb vessels with 8 pound pieces. The expedition was financed by Pope Pius VI and supported by the Navy of the Kingdom of the Two Sicilies, which provided two ships of the line, three frigates, two brigs and two xebecs under Admiral Bologna, by the Order of Malta, which provided a ship of line, two frigates and five galleys, and by that of Portugal, which provided two ships of line and two frigates under Admiral Ramires Esquível.  These last joined the allied fleet later and arrived in the middle of the bombardment.

Bombardment

On 28 June, having entrusted itself to the Virgen del Carmen, the Allied fleet sailed from Cartagena, arriving off Algiers on 10 July. Two days later at 8:30 AM, the bombardment began with the Spanish ships opening fire. It was kept up until 4:20 PM, during which time about 600 bombs, 1,440 cannon balls and 260 shells were fired over the city, compared to 202 bombs and 1,164 cannonballs fired by the Algerians. Major damage to the city and its fortifications and a large fire were observed.  An attack by light vessels of the Algerian fleet, composed of 67 ships, was repulsed, four of them being destroyed. The Allied casualties were minimal: 6 killed and 9 wounded, most of them due to accidents with the fuses of the bombs. Gunboat No. 27, commanded by the Neapolitan ensign José Rodríguez, exploded accidentally, killing 25 sailors.

In the following eight days, seven additional attacks were ordered. The Algerians had placed a line of barges armed with artillery that largely prevented the Allied gunboats getting close to their objectives. A shot fired from the fortifications hit the felucca from which Barceló was directing the bombing, sinking it. José Lorenzo de Goicoechea came to the aid of the admiral, who was rescued unscathed. Passing immediately to another boat, Barceló continued leading the attack, downplaying the importance of the incident. Finally, on 21 July, it was decided to end the attack. Contrary winds forced Barceló to give the order to return to Cartagena. More than 20,000 cannonballs and grenades had been fired on the city, badly damaging the city and causing the sinking in the harbour of most of the Algerian vessels. The Allied casualties were 53 men killed and 64 wounded, most due to accidents.

Aftermath
The bombardment was unsuccessful, nevertheless a period of negotiations began from 1785 to 1787 - the Dey of Algiers agreed to open these with Spain. The first peace treaty was signed on 16 June 1785 followed by a second treaty signed on 14 June 1786 in which the Spanish agreed to pay 1 million pesos as reparations. The signing of these treaties did not end hostilities and skirmishes and further negotiations continued.

Notes

References

 
 Fernández Duro, Cesáreo. Armada Española desde la unión de los reinos de Castilla y Aragón, Volumen II.  Est. tipográfico "Sucesores de Rivadeneyra", 1902.
 Juan Vidal, Josep; Martínez Ruiz, Enrique. Política interior y exterior de los Borbones. Ediciones Akal, 2001. 
 Laínz, Jesús. La nación falsificada. Encuentro, 2006. 
 Martinez Guanter, Antonio Luis. Don Antonio Barceló, el "Capitán Toni". Revista de Historia Naval.
 Rodríguez González, Agustín Ramón. Trafalgar y el conflicto naval Anglo-Español del siglo XVIII. Actas Editorial, 2005. 
 Sánchez Doncel, Gregorio. Presencia de España en Orán (1509-1792). .T. San Ildefonso, 1991. 
 Trigo Chacón, Manuel. Los estados y las relaciones internacionales. Editorial Visión Libros, 2008. 
 Universidad de Barcelona, Departament d'Història Moderna, 1984 Congrés d'Història Moderna de Catalunya. Primer Congrés d'Història Moderna de Catalunya, Volumen 1. Edicions Universitat Barcelona, 1984. 

Barbary pirates
Algiers
Algiers
Algiers
Algiers
Algiers
Algiers
History of Algiers
1784 in Africa
1784 in the Ottoman Empire
18th century in Algiers
Algiers